Seri Wati Iku (sometimes given as Seriwati Iku) is a politician from the Cocos (Keeling) Islands, Australia, who was President of the Cocos (Keeling) Islands Shire Council from 2017 to 2019.

Career 
Iku was first elected to a position on the Council in 2015 and is one of only a handful of women to serve on the body since it was founded in 1992. In October 2017, she was elected by other members of the Council to serve as Shire President; she is the first woman to hold that position in the history of the islands. Her term of office ended in 2019.

In her professional life, she serves as a project manager for the Cocos Islands Cooperative. As a shire councillor, Iku has participated in discussions with the Australian government regarding the territory's strategic location and the desire by Australia to establish a defensive presence in the islands. She has expressed reservations about the idea, largely because of concerns that a large non-Islander population might negatively influence the local culture. She has also said that an Australian-only presence, rather than one which involves other nations, might be considered more favorably.

Personal life 
Iku is married to a man from Malaysia Fazli Musa, and has a son named Izahan Fazli. She said that she hopes her example will inspire other women in the islands to pursue an interest in local politics.

References

People from the Cocos (Keeling) Islands
21st-century Australian politicians
21st-century Australian women politicians
Living people
Year of birth missing (living people)
Australian Muslims